Daucus carota, whose common names include wild carrot, European wild carrot, bird's nest, bishop's lace, and Queen Anne's lace (North America), is a flowering plant in the family Apiaceae. It is native to temperate regions of the Old World and was naturalized in the New World.

Domesticated carrots are cultivars of a subspecies, Daucus carota subsp. sativus.

Description

The leaves are tripinnate, finely divided and lacy, and overall triangular in shape. The flowers are small and dull white, clustered in flat, dense umbels. They may be pink in bud and may have a reddish or purple flower in the centre of the umbel. The lower bracts are three-forked or pinnate, which distinguishes the plant from other white-flowered umbellifers. As the seeds develop, the umbel curls up at the edges, becomes more congested, and develops a concave surface. The fruits are small, dry, bumpy, oval and flattened, with short styles and hooked spines, as well as protective hairs surrounding it. The fruit has two mericarps, or bicarpellate. The endosperm of the fruit grows before the embryo. The dried umbels detach from the plant, becoming tumbleweeds. The function of the tiny red flower, coloured by anthocyanin, is to attract insects. The flowers bloom from May to September.

Similar in appearance to the deadly poison hemlock, D.carota is distinguished by a mix of tripinnate leaves, fine hairs on its solid green stems and on its leaves, a root that smells like carrots, and occasionally a single dark red flower in the center of the umbel. Hemlock is also different in tending to have purple mottling on its stems, which also lack the hairiness of the plain green Queen Anne's lace (wild carrot) stems. Both plants have been spread into North America by European settlers and are now common wildflowers there.

Function of the dark central florets
The function of the central dark florets of D. carota has been subject to debate since Charles Darwin speculated that they are a vestigial trait. It has been suggested that they have the adaptive function of mimicking insects, thus either discouraging herbivory, or attracting pollinators by indicating the presence of food or opportunities for mating. One study in Portugal found that the dark florets contributed to visitation by the varied carpet beetle, Anthrenus verbasci, and that higher numbers of dark florets correlated with increased visitation, whereas inflorescences without dark florets had fewer visits. Replacing the dark florets with one or more freeze-killed A. verbasci, who are similar to the florets in size and shape produced similar results to those observations of inflorescences with intact florets.

Taxonomy 
The carrot was first officially described by Carl Linnaeus in his 1753 work Species Plantarum. In 2016, an international team  sequenced the full genome of Daucus carota.

Subspecies
Cultivated carrot's only parent is Daucus carota.

Both domestic and wild carrot are from the same species, Daucus carota L. There are several subspecies of D. carota that have evolved to different climates and atmospheres. Two examples of these subspecies are specifically from the Netherlands. D. carota subsp. sativus has roots that can be a wide range of colors. It has a thicker root and sweeter taste. The whorl of barbs above the spine on the vallecular ridges of the mericarp of D. carota subsp. sativus mature very well. D. carota subsp. carota has white roots that do not vary in color and, unlike D. carota subsp. sativus, has a thin root, bitter taste and are not edible. The middle umbellet of D. carota subsp. carota is not well developed (unlike in D. carota subsp. sativus) and the color of the flower can vary from red to deep purple.

Subtaxa 
The following subtaxa are accepted:

Daucus carota var. abyssinicus 
Daucus carota subsp. annuus 
Daucus carota subsp. azoricus 
Daucus carota subsp. cantabricus 
Daucus carota subsp. capillifolius 
Daucus carota subsp. caporientalis 
Daucus carota subsp. carota
Daucus carota subsp. commutatus 
Daucus carota subsp. corsoccidentalis 
Daucus carota subsp. drepanensis 
Daucus carota subsp. fontanesii 
Daucus carota subsp. gadecaei 
Daucus carota subsp. gummifer 
Daucus carota subsp. halophilus 
Daucus carota subsp. hispanicus 
Daucus carota subsp. major 
Daucus carota subsp. majoricus 
Daucus carota subsp. maritimus 
Daucus carota subsp. maximus 
Daucus carota var. meriensis 
Daucus carota subsp. otaportensis 
Daucus carota subsp. rupestris 
Daucus carota subsp. sativus 
Daucus carota subsp. tenuissimus 
Daucus carota subsp. valeriae

Distribution and habitat 
Native to temperate regions of Europe and southwest Asia, the plant was spread to North America and Australia.

The plant is commonly found along roadsides and in unused fields. It thrives best in sun to partial shade.

Toxicity 
Skin contact with the foliage of Daucus carota, especially wet foliage, can cause skin irritation in some people. It may also have a mild effect on horses.

The compound falcarinol is naturally found in Daucus carota for protection against fungal diseases. Lab tests show the compound to be toxic to mice and the water flea Daphnia magna. Normal consumption of carrots has no toxic effect in humans.

Uses 
Like the cultivated carrot, the D. carota root is edible while young, but it quickly becomes too woody to consume. The flowers are sometimes battered and fried. The leaves and seeds are also edible.

D. carota bears a close resemblance to poison hemlock, and the leaves of the wild carrot may cause phytophotodermatitis, so caution should also be used when handling the plant. The seeds and flowers have been used as a method of contraception and an abortifacient for centuries. If used as a dyestuff, the flowers give a creamy, off-white color.

D. carota, when freshly cut, will draw or change color depending on the color of the water in which it is held. This effect is only visible on the "head" or flower of the plant. Carnations also exhibit this effect. This occurrence is a popular science demonstration in grade school.

Beneficial weed
This beneficial weed can be used as a companion plant to crops. Like most members of the umbellifer family, it attracts wasps to its small flowers in its native land; however, where it has been introduced, it attracts very few wasps. In northeast Wisconsin, when introduced with blueberries it did succeed in attracting butterflies and wasps. This species is also documented to boost tomato plant production when kept nearby, and it can provide a microclimate of cooler, moister air for lettuce, when intercropped with it. However, the states of Iowa, Michigan, and Washington have listed it as a noxious weed, and it is considered a serious pest in pastures. It persists in the soil seed bank for two to five years.

Taste
Several different factors can cause the root of a carrot to have abnormal metabolites (notably 6-methoxymellin) that can cause a bitter taste in the roots. For example, carrots have a bitterer taste when grown in the presence of apples. Also, ethylene can easily produce stress, causing a bitter taste.

Culture
Daucus carota was introduced and naturalized in North America, where it is often known as Queen Anne's lace. Both Anne, Queen of Great Britain, and her great-grandmother, Anne of Denmark, are taken to be the Queen Anne for whom the plant is named. It is so called because the flower resembles lace, prominent in fine clothing of the day; the red flower in the center is said to represent a droplet of blood where Queen Anne pricked herself with a needle when she was making the lace.

History through artwork
The history of Daucus carota and its cultivation in different parts of the world can be traced back through historical texts and artwork. Paintings from the 16th and 17th century, for example, that are of maids in a market or farmers' most recent crops can provide information on carrots' history. Studying such paintings shows that yellow or red roots were cultivated in Turkey, North Africa, and Spain. Orange roots were cultivated in 17th century Netherlands.

References in poetry
Queen Anne's Lace is the title and subject of a poem by William Carlos Williams published in the 1921 collection titled Sour Grapes.

See also
Daucus pusillus, American wild carrot

References

Further reading

External links

Connecticut Botanical Society

Daucus
Medicinal plants of Asia
Medicinal plants of Europe
Plants described in 1753
Taxa named by Carl Linnaeus
Tumbleweeds
Abortifacients
Flora of Malta